Aus Italien (From Italy), Op. 16, is a tone poem or program symphony for orchestra by Richard Strauss, described by the composer as a "symphonic fantasy". It was completed in 1886 when he was 22 years old. It was inspired by the composer's visit to Italy (encouraged by Johannes Brahms) in the summer of the same year, where he travelled to Rome, Bologna, Naples, Sorrento, Salerno, and Capri. He began to sketch the work while still on the journey.

The full score of the work, Strauss's first tone poem, was completed in Munich on September 12, 1886. The work is named by the composer as "Symphonic Fantasy", and is dedicated to his mentor Hans von Bülow. It is the only work by Richard Strauss for which he himself wrote a specific program. The entire work takes over forty minutes to perform.

Strauss incorporated the tune of "Funiculì, Funiculà" into the symphony's fourth movement, "Neapolitan Folk Life", thinking it was a traditional Italian folk song, when it was in fact a piece written by Luigi Denza in 1880. Denza filed a lawsuit against Strauss and eventually won.

Premières
The first performance of the work took place in Munich on March 2, 1887, by the Court Orchestra, which was conducted by the composer himself. As Richard Strauss's sister Johanna later recalled, the first three movements were received with applause, but the last movement was not well-approved and derisory whistles came from various quarters. Norman Del Mar's biography of the composer tells a different story: the first three movements were not well received, and the final was accorded booing and applause. Strauss himself found the work itself as new and revolutionary, and he was satisfied despite the critical responses for the première.

The first performance in the United States was given on March 8, 1888, with the Theodore Thomas Orchestra (Theodore Thomas conducting) at the Academy of Music in Philadelphia.

Structure
Aus Italien is more similar in form to a conventional symphony than Strauss's other tone poems in that it follows the traditional four-movement symphonic structure.  However, the pictorially descriptive quality of the music sets it apart from a conventional symphony, which is absolute music.

Instrumentation
Aus Italien is scored for the following orchestra:

 Woodwind: piccolo, 2 flutes, 2 oboes (2nd doubling English horn), 2 clarinets in B-flat, 2 bassoons, contrabassoon
 Brass: 4 horns in F, 2 trumpets in C, 3 trombones
 Percussion: timpani, snare drum, tambourine, cymbals, triangle
 Strings: harp, violins i, ii, violas, cellos, double basses

Discography
Performances of the full score only
	

There is also a recording of the two piano version, with the duo pianists Begonia Uriarte-Mrongovius and Karl-Hermann Mrongovius recorded in 1985.

References
Del Mar, Norman. Richard Strauss, A Critical Commentary on His Life and Works, vol. 1. London, 1962.

External links

Tone poems by Richard Strauss
1886 compositions
Songs involved in plagiarism controversies